Oliver Puflett (born 26 July 1999) is an Australian soccer player who plays as a striker for S.League club Home United.

Youth career 

Puflett started his career with the Western Sydney Wanderers FC, playing for its Under-21 team, scoring 5 goals in 11 games over 2 years. He also won the Y-League title in the 2017–18 season with them.

Career

Home United 
He played for the Western Sydney Wanderers FC Under-21 squad before signing his first professional contract and joining Singapore Premier League side Home United FC in March 2019. 

He then made his debut a day after his signing, scoring a goal with an exquisite lobbed finish on his professional debut in a Uniform Derby win against Warriors FC.

Career statistics

References

External links 

1999 births
Living people
Australian soccer players
Association football forwards
Home United FC players
Singapore Premier League players